The Avon River is a river in Perth County, Ontario, Canada. The river was named after the River Avon in England when the town of Stratford was founded on its banks in 1832. The Avon River rises northeast of Stratford and flows southwest, entering the North Thames River near St. Marys. It was originally known as the Little Thames River.

Course

The river begins in a field northeast of the community of Shakespeare in Perth East. It flows west to the north of the community, south of Brocksden, and into Lake Victoria, a seasonal reservoir created by the Thomas Orr Dam, in Stratford. The Avon River continues west through the community of Avonton in Perth South, and heads south through the community of Avonbank. It then empties into the North Thames River, as a left tributary, between the community of Motherwell to the north and the town of St. Marys to the south.

Tributaries
Dunseith Drain
Douglas Drain
Hislop Drain
Court Drain
Kuhne Drain
Central School Drain
Sheerer Drain

See also

List of rivers of Ontario

References

Sources

Stratford, Ontario
Rivers of Perth County, Ontario